Christopher Michael Benoit (May 21, 1967 – June 24, 2007) was a Canadian professional wrestler. He worked for various pro-wrestling promotions during his 22-year career including most notably the World Wrestling Federation/World Wrestling Entertainment (WWF/WWE), World Championship Wrestling (WCW) and Extreme Championship Wrestling (ECW) in the USA, New Japan Pro-Wrestling (NJPW) in Japan and Stampede Wrestling in Canada.

Bearing the nicknames The (Canadian) Crippler alongside The Rabid Wolverine throughout his career, Benoit held 30 championships between WWF/WWE, WCW, NJPW, ECW and Stampede. He was a two-time world champion, having reigned as a one-time WCW World Heavyweight Champion, and a one-time World Heavyweight Champion in WWE; he was booked to win a third world championship at a WWE event on the night of his death. Benoit was the twelfth WWE Triple Crown Champion and the seventh WCW Triple Crown Champion, and the second of four men in history to achieve both the WWE and WCW Triple Crown Championships. He was also the 2004 Royal Rumble winner, joining Shawn Michaels and preceding Edge as one of three men to win a Royal Rumble as the number one entrant. Benoit headlined multiple pay-per-views for WWE, including a victory in the World Heavyweight Championship main event match of WrestleMania XX in March 2004.

In a three-day double-murder and suicide, Benoit murdered his wife in their residence on June 22, 2007, killed his 7-year-old son on June 23, and committed suicide on June 24. Subsequent research undertaken by the Sports Legacy Institute (now the Concussion Legacy Foundation) suggested that depression and chronic traumatic encephalopathy (CTE), a condition of brain damage, from numerous concussions that Benoit had sustained during his professional wrestling career were both likely contributing factors of the crimes.

Due to his murders, Benoit's legacy in the professional wrestling industry has remained incredibly controversial and heavily debated. Benoit has been renowned by many for his exceptional technical wrestling ability. Prominent combat sports journalist Dave Meltzer considers Benoit "one of the top 10, maybe even [in] the top five, all-time greats" in pro-wrestling history.

Benoit was inducted into the Stampede Wrestling Hall of Fame in 1995 and the Wrestling Observer Newsletter Hall of Fame in 2003. His WON induction was put to a referendum-style re-vote for WON readers in 2008 to determine if he should remain a member of the WON Hall of Fame. Ultimately, the threshold percentage of votes required to remove Benoit was not met and he still remains in that Hall of Fame.

Early life
Benoit was born in Montreal, Quebec, the son of Michael and Margaret Benoit. He grew up in Edmonton, Alberta, from where he was billed throughout the bulk of his career. He had a sister living near Edmonton.

During his childhood and early adolescence in Edmonton, Benoit idolized Tom "Dynamite Kid" Billington and Bret Hart; at twelve years old, he attended a local wrestling event at which the two performers "stood out above everyone else". Benoit trained to become a professional wrestler in the Hart family "Dungeon", receiving education from family patriarch Stu Hart. In-ring, Benoit emulated both Billington and Bret Hart, cultivating a high-risk style and physical appearance more reminiscent of the former (years later, he adopted Hart's trademark "Sharpshooter" hold as a finishing move).

Professional wrestling career

Stampede Wrestling (1985–1989) 
Benoit began his career in 1985, in Stu Hart's Stampede Wrestling promotion. From the beginning, similarities between Benoit and Billington were apparent, as Benoit adopted many of his moves such as the diving headbutt and the snap suplex; the homage was complete with his initial billing as "Dynamite" Chris Benoit. According to Benoit, in his first match, he attempted the diving headbutt before learning how to land correctly, and had the wind knocked out of him; he said he would never do the move again at that point. His debut match was a tag team match on November 22, 1985, in Calgary, Alberta, where he teamed with "The Remarkable" Rick Patterson against Butch Moffat and Mike Hammer, which Benoit's team won the match after Benoit pinned Moffat with a sunset flip. The first title Benoit ever won was the Stampede British Commonwealth Mid-Heavyweight Championship on March 18, 1988, against Gama Singh. During his tenure in Stampede, he won four International Tag Team and three more British Commonwealth titles, and had a lengthy feud with Johnny Smith that lasted for over a year, which both men traded back-and-forth the British Commonwealth title. In 1989, Stampede closed its doors, and with a recommendation from Bad News Allen, Benoit departed for New Japan Pro-Wrestling.

New Japan Pro-Wrestling (1986–1999) 
Upon arriving in New Japan Pro-Wrestling (NJPW), Benoit spent about a year training in their "New Japan Dojo" with the younger wrestlers to improve his abilities. While in the dojo, he spent months doing strenuous activities like push-ups and floor sweeping before stepping into the ring. He made his Japanese debut in 1986 under his real name. In 1989, he started wearing a mask and assuming the name The Pegasus Kid. Benoit said numerous times that he originally hated the mask, but it eventually became a part of him. While with NJPW, he came into his own as a performer in critically acclaimed matches with luminaries like Jushin Thunder Liger, Shinjiro Otani, Black Tiger, and El Samurai in their junior heavyweight division.

In August 1990, he won his first major championship, the IWGP Junior Heavyweight Championship, from Jushin Thunder Liger. He eventually lost the title in November 1990 (and in July 1991 in Japan and in November 1991 in Mexico, his mask) back to Liger, forcing him to reinvent himself as Wild Pegasus. Benoit spent the next couple years in Japan, winning the Best of the Super Juniors tournament twice in 1993 and 1995. He went on to win the inaugural Super J-Cup tournament in 1994, defeating Black Tiger, Gedo, and The Great Sasuke in the finals. He wrestled outside New Japan occasionally to compete in Mexico and Europe, where he won a few regional championships, including the UWA Light Heavyweight Championship. He held that title for over a year, having many forty-plus minute matches with Villano III.

World Championship Wrestling (1992–1993) 
Benoit first came to World Championship Wrestling in June 1992, teaming up with fellow Canadian wrestler Biff Wellington for the NWA World Tag Team Championship tournament; they were defeated by Brian Pillman and Jushin Thunder Liger in the first round at Clash of the Champions XIX.

He did not return to WCW until January 1993 at Clash of the Champions XXII, defeating Brad Armstrong. A month later, at SuperBrawl III, he lost to 2 Cold Scorpio, getting pinned with only three seconds left in the 20-minute time limit. At the same time, he formed a tag team with Bobby Eaton. After he and Eaton lost to Scorpio and Marcus Bagwell at Slamboree, Benoit headed back to Japan.

Extreme Championship Wrestling (1994–1995) 
In August 1994, Benoit began working with Extreme Championship Wrestling (ECW) in between tours of Japan. He was booked as a dominant wrestler there, gaining notoriety as the "Crippler" after he put Rocco Rock out. In his first appearance, Benoit competed in a one-night eight-man tournament for the vacant NWA World Heavyweight Championship, losing to 2 Cold Scorpio in the quarter-finals match.

At November to Remember, Benoit accidentally broke Sabu's neck within the opening seconds of the match. The injury came when Benoit threw Sabu with the intention that he take a face-first "pancake" bump, but Sabu attempted to turn mid-air and take a backdrop bump instead. He did not achieve full rotation and landed almost directly on his neck.

After this match Benoit returned to the locker room and broke down over the possibility that he might have paralysed someone. Paul Heyman, the head booker of ECW at the time, came up with the idea of continuing the "Crippler" moniker for Benoit. From that point until his departure from ECW, he was known as "Crippler Benoit". When he returned to WCW in October 1995, WCW modified his ring name to "Canadian Crippler Chris Benoit". In The Rise and Fall of ECW book, Heyman commented that he planned on using Benoit as a dominant heel for quite some time, before putting the company's main title, the ECW World Heavyweight Championship, on him to be the long-term champion of the company.

Benoit and Dean Malenko won the ECW World Tag Team Championship - Benoit's first American title - from Sabu and The Tazmaniac in February 1995 at Return of the Funker. After winning, they were initiated into the Triple Threat stable, led by ECW World Heavyweight Champion, Shane Douglas, as Douglas's attempt to recreate the Four Horsemen, as the three-man contingency held all three of the ECW championships at the time (Malenko also held the ECW World Television Championship at the time). The team lost the championship to The Public Enemy that April at Three Way Dance. Benoit spent some time in ECW feuding with The Steiner Brothers and rekindling the feud with 2 Cold Scorpio. He was forced to leave ECW after his work visa expired; Heyman was supposed to renew it, but he failed to make it on time, so Benoit left ECW in August 1995 as a matter of job security and the ability to enter the United States. He toured Japan until WCW called.

Return to WCW (1995–2000)

The Four Horsemen (1995–1999)
New Japan Pro-Wrestling and World Championship Wrestling (WCW) had a working relationship, and because of their "talent exchange" program, Benoit signed with WCW in late 1995 along with a number of talent working in New Japan to be a part of the angle. Like the majority of those who came to WCW in the exchange, he started out in as a member of the cruiserweight division, having lengthy matches against many of his former rivals in Japan on almost every single broadcast. At the end of 1995, Benoit went back to Japan as a part of the "talent exchange" to wrestle as a representative for New Japan in the Super J-Cup: 2nd Stage, defeating Lionheart in the quarterfinals (he received a bye to the quarterfinals for his work in 1995, similar to the way he advanced in the 1994 edition) and losing to Gedo in the semifinals.

After impressing higher-ups with his work, he was approached by Ric Flair and the WCW booking staff to become a member of the reformed Four Horsemen in 1995, alongside Flair, Arn Anderson, and Brian Pillman; he was introduced by Pillman as a gruff, no-nonsense heel similar to his ECW persona, "The Crippler". He was brought in to add a new dynamic for Anderson and Flair's tormenting of Hulk Hogan and Randy Savage in their "Alliance to End Hulkamania", which saw the Horsemen team up with The Dungeon of Doom, but that alliance ended with Dungeon leader and WCW booker, Kevin Sullivan feuding with Pillman. When Pillman abruptly left the company for the WWF, Benoit was placed into his ongoing feud with Sullivan. This came to fruition through a dissension between the two in a tag team match with the two reluctantly teaming with each other against The Public Enemy, and Benoit being attacked by Sullivan at Slamboree. This led to the two having violent confrontations at pay-per-views, which led to Sullivan booking a feud in which Benoit was having an affair with Sullivan's real-life wife and onscreen valet, Nancy (also known as Woman). Benoit and Nancy were forced to spend time together to make the affair look real, (hold hands in public, share hotel rooms, etc.).

This onscreen relationship developed into a real-life affair offscreen. As a result, Sullivan and Benoit had a contentious backstage relationship at best, and an undying hatred for each other at worst. Benoit did, however, admit having a certain amount of respect for Sullivan, saying on the DVD Hard Knocks: The Chris Benoit Story that Sullivan never took undue liberties in the ring during their feud, even though he blamed Benoit for breaking up his marriage. This continued for over the course of a year with Sullivan having his enforcers apprehend Benoit in a multitude of matches. This culminated in a retirement match at the Bash at the Beach, where Benoit defeated Sullivan; this was used to explain Sullivan going to a behind-the-scenes role, where he could focus on his initial job of booking.

In 1998, Benoit had a long feud with Booker T. They fought over the WCW World Television Championship until Booker lost the title to Fit Finlay. Booker won a "Best-of-Seven" series which was held between the two to determine a number one contender. Benoit went up 3 to 1 before Booker caught up, forcing the 7th and final match on Monday Nitro. During the match, Bret Hart interjected himself, interfering on behalf of Benoit in an attempt to get him to join the New World Order. Benoit refused to win that way and told the referee what happened, getting himself disqualified. Booker refused that victory, instead opting for an eighth match at the Great American Bash to see who would fight Finlay later that night. Booker won the final match and went on to beat Finlay for the title. This feud significantly elevated both men's careers as singles competitors, and both remained at the top of the midcard afterward.

In 1999, Benoit teamed with Dean Malenko once again and defeated Curt Hennig and Barry Windham to win the WCW World Tag Team Championship. This led to a reformation of the Four Horsemen with the tag team champions, Anderson, and Steve "Mongo" McMichael. The two hunted after the tag team championship for several months, feuding with teams like Raven and Perry Saturn or Billy Kidman and Rey Mysterio Jr.

The Revolution and World Heavyweight Champion (1999–2000)
After a falling out with Anderson and McMichael, Benoit and Malenko left the Horsemen; he won the WCW United States Heavyweight Championship before bringing together Malenko, Perry Saturn, and Shane Douglas to form "The Revolution".

The Revolution was a heel stable of younger wrestlers who felt slighted (both kayfabe and legitimate) by WCW management, believing they never gave them the chance to be stars, pushing older, more established wrestlers instead, despite their then-current questionable worthiness of their pushes. This led to the Revolution seceding from WCW, and forming their own nation, complete with a flag. This led to some friction being created between Benoit and leader, Douglas, who called into question Benoit's heart in the group, causing Benoit to quit the group, thus turning face, and having his own crusade against the top stars, winning the Television title one more time and the United States title from Jeff Jarrett in a ladder match. In October 1999 on Nitro in Kansas City, Missouri, Benoit wrestled Bret Hart as a tribute to Bret's brother Owen Hart, who had recently died due to an equipment malfunction. Hart defeated Benoit by submission, and the two received a standing ovation, and an embrace from guest ring announcer, Harley Race.

Benoit was unhappy working for WCW. One last attempt in January 2000 was made to try to keep him with WCW, by putting the vacant WCW World Heavyweight Championship on him by defeating Sid Vicious at Souled Out. However, due to disagreements with management and to protest the promotion of Kevin Sullivan to head booker, Benoit left the company the next day alongside his friends Eddie Guerrero, Dean Malenko, and Perry Saturn, forfeiting his title in the process. WCW then refused to acknowledge Benoit's victory as an official title reign, and Benoit's title reign was not listed in the title lineage at WCW.com. However, the WWF recognized Benoit's title win, and Benoit's title reign is still listed in the title lineage at WWE.com. Benoit spent the next few weeks in Japan before heading to the WWF, who acknowledged his WCW World Heavyweight Championship win and presented him as a former world champion.

World Wrestling Federation/Entertainment (2000–2007)

The Radicalz and teaming with Chris Jericho (2000–2001) 

Along with Guerrero, Saturn, and Malenko, Benoit debuted in the WWF as a stable that became known as The Radicalz. After losing their "tryout matches" upon entry, The Radicalz aligned themselves with WWF Champion Triple H and became a heel faction. Benoit quickly won his first title in the WWF just over a month later at WrestleMania 2000, pinning Chris Jericho in a triple threat match to win Kurt Angle's Intercontinental Championship. It was also in this time period that Benoit wrestled in his first WWF pay-per-view main events, challenging The Rock for the WWF Championship at Fully Loaded in July and as part of a fatal four-way title match at Unforgiven in September. On both occasions Benoit appeared to have won the title, only to have the decision reversed by then-WWF commissioner Mick Foley due to cheating on Benoit's part. Benoit simultaneously entered into a long-running feud with Jericho for the Intercontinental title, with the two meeting at Backlash, Judgment Day and SummerSlam; Benoit winning all three matches. The feud finally culminated in Jericho defeating Benoit in a ladder match at the Royal Rumble in January 2001. Benoit won the Intercontinental title three times between April 2000 and January 2001.

In early 2001, Benoit broke away from The Radicalz (who had recently reformed three months earlier) and turned face, feuding first with his former stablemates and then with Kurt Angle, whom he wrestled and lost to at WrestleMania X-Seven. He gained some amount of revenge after beating Angle in an "Ultimate Submission" match at Backlash. The feud continued after Benoit stole Angle's cherished Olympic Gold Medal. This culminated in a match at Judgment Day where Angle won a two out of three falls match with the help of Edge and Christian. In response, Benoit teamed up with his former rival Jericho to defeat Edge and Christian in that night's Tag Team Turmoil match.

The next night on Raw Is War, Benoit and Jericho defeated WWF Tag Team Champions Stone Cold Steve Austin and Triple H for their title. The pair used the win as a springboard to challenge Austin for his WWF Championship. Benoit got two title matches the following week, first losing in a manner similar to the Montreal Screwjob in Calgary and then losing in a close match in Benoit's hometown of Edmonton. However, Benoit injured his neck in a four-way TLC match that required surgery with Dr. Lloyd Youngblood. Despite this, he continued to wrestle until the King of the Ring, where he was pinned in a triple threat match versus Austin and Jericho. Benoit missed the next year due to his neck injury, missing the entire Invasion storyline.

Championship pursuits and reigns (2002–2003) 

During the first WWF draft, he was the third wrestler picked by Vince McMahon to be part of the new SmackDown! roster, although still on the injured list. However, when he returned, he did so as a member of the Raw roster. On his first night back, he turned heel again and aligned himself with Eddie Guerrero, and he feuded with Stone Cold Steve Austin briefly. Benoit defeated Rob Van Dam on the July 29, 2002 edition of Raw to become Intercontinental Champion for the fourth time.  He and Guerrero were then moved to SmackDown! during a storyline "open season" on wrestler contracts, with Benoit taking his newly won belt with him. Van Dam defeated Benoit at SummerSlam and returned the title to Raw.

After returning to SmackDown!, he embarked on a feud with Kurt Angle in which he defeated him at Unforgiven. On October 20, 2002, at No Mercy, he teamed with Angle to win a tournament to crown the first-ever WWE Tag Team Champions. They became tweeners after betraying Los Guerreros. At Rebellion, Benoit and Angle made their successful title defence, defeating Los Guerreros. They lost the championships to Edge and Rey Mysterio Jr. on the November 7 episode of SmackDown! in a two-out-of-three falls match. They received a rematch at Survivor Series in a triple threat elimination match against Edge and Mysterio and Los Guerreros, but failed to win the titles after being the first team eliminated. The team split up shortly afterward and Benoit became a face.

Angle won his third WWE Championship from Big Show at Armageddon, and Benoit faced him for the title at the 2003 Royal Rumble. The match was highly praised from fans and critics. Although Benoit lost the match, he received a standing ovation for his efforts. Benoit returned to the tag team ranks, teaming with the returning Rhyno.

At WrestleMania XIX, the WWE Tag Team Champions, Team Angle (Charlie Haas and Shelton Benjamin), put their titles on the line against Benoit and his partner Rhyno and Los Guerreros in a triple threat tag team match. Team Angle retained when Benjamin pinned Chavo.

In April 2003, following WrestleMania XIX, Benoit then feuded with John Cena (wearing a shirt saying "Toothless Aggression") and The Full Blooded Italians, teaming with Rhyno occasionally.

In June 2003, the WCW United States Championship was reactivated and renamed the WWE United States Championship, and Benoit participated in the tournament for the title. He lost in the final match to Eddie Guerrero at Vengeance. The two feuded over the title for the next month, and Benoit went on to defeat the likes of A-Train at No Mercy, Big Show, and eliminating Brock Lesnar by submission at Survivor Series as part of a Survivor Series elimination tag team match between Team Angle against Team Lesnar. As a result, Benoit challenged Lesnar for the WWE Championship on the December 4 episode of SmackDown!, but lost after passing out to Lesnar's debuting Brock Lock submission hold. General Manager Paul Heyman had a vendetta against Benoit along with Lesnar, preventing him from gaining a shot at Lesnar's WWE title.

World Heavyweight Champion (2004–2005) 
When Benoit won a qualifying match for the 2004 Royal Rumble against the Full Blooded Italians in a handicap match with John Cena, Heyman named him as the number one entry. On January 25, 2004, he won the Royal Rumble by last eliminating Big Show, and thus earned a world title shot at WrestleMania XX. He became only the second WWE performer to win the Royal Rumble as the number one entrant along with Shawn Michaels. With Benoit being on the SmackDown! brand at the time, it was assumed that he was going to compete for his brand's championship, the WWE Championship. However, Benoit exploited a "loophole" in the rules and moved to the Raw brand the following night to announce he would instead challenge World Heavyweight Champion Triple H at WrestleMania. Though the match was originally intended to be a one-on-one match, Shawn Michaels, whose Last Man Standing match against Triple H at the Royal Rumble for the World Heavyweight Championship ended in a draw, thought that he deserved to be in the main event. When it was time for Benoit to sign the contract putting himself in the main event, Michaels superkicked him and signed his name on the contract, which eventually resulted in a Triple Threat match between Michaels, Benoit, and the champion, Triple H.

On March 14, 2004, at WrestleMania XX, Benoit won the World Heavyweight Championship by forcing Triple H to tap out to his signature submission move, the Crippler Crossface, in a highly acclaimed match. The match marked the first time the main event of a WrestleMania ended in submission. After the match, Benoit celebrated his win with then-reigning WWE Champion Eddie Guerrero. The rematch was held at Backlash in Benoit's hometown of Edmonton. It was Michaels who ended up submitting to Benoit's Sharpshooter, allowing Benoit to retain his title. The next night in Calgary, he and Edge won the World Tag Team Championship from Batista and Ric Flair, making Benoit a double champion.

Following his victories, Benoit and Edge engaged in a rivalry with La Résistance for the World Tag Team Championship, which saw a series of matches (including losing the titles to La Résistance on the May 31 episode of Raw), while simultaneously having confrontations with Kane over the World Heavyweight Championship. Benoit wrestled in two matches at Bad Blood in his respective rivalries; he and Edge failed to regain the World Tag Team Championship (winning by disqualification when Kane interfered) while he successfully defended the World Heavyweight Championship against Kane. A month later at Vengeance, Benoit retained the title against Triple H.

On August 15, 2004, Benoit was defeated by Randy Orton for the World Heavyweight Championship at SummerSlam. Benoit then teamed with William Regal at Unforgiven against Ric Flair and Batista in a winning effort. Benoit then feuded with Edge (who had turned into an arrogant and conceited heel), leading to Taboo Tuesday where Benoit, Edge, and Shawn Michaels were all put into a poll to see who would face Triple H for the World Heavyweight title that night. Michaels received the most votes and as a result, Edge and Benoit were forced to team up to face the World Tag Team Champions, La Résistance, in the same night. However, Edge deserted Benoit during the match and Benoit was forced to take on both members of La Résistance by himself. He and Edge still managed to regain the World Tag Team Championship. They lost the titles back to La Résistance on the November 1 episode of Raw. At Survivor Series, Benoit sided with Randy Orton's team while Edge teamed with Triple H's team, and while Edge was able to pin Benoit after a Pedigree, Orton's team won.

The Benoit-Edge feud ended at New Year's Revolution in an Elimination Chamber match, which both men lost. The feud stopped abruptly, as Edge feuded with Shawn Michaels, and Benoit entered the Royal Rumble, lasting longer than any competitor before being eliminated by Ric Flair. The two then continued to have matches in the following weeks until the two of them, Chris Jericho, Shelton Benjamin, Kane, and Christian were placed in the Money in the Bank ladder match at WrestleMania 21. Edge won the match by knocking Benoit off of the ladder by smashing his arm with a chair. The feud finally culminated in a Last Man Standing match at Backlash, which Edge won with a brick shot to the back of Benoit's head.

United States Champion (2005–2007) 
On June 9, Benoit was drafted to the SmackDown! brand after being the first man selected by SmackDown! in the 2005 Draft Lottery and participated in an ECW-style revolution against the SmackDown! heels. Benoit appeared at ECW One Night Stand, defeating Eddie Guerrero.

On July 24 at The Great American Bash, Benoit failed to win the WWE United States Championship from Orlando Jordan, but won a rematch at SummerSlam in 25 seconds. Benoit then won three consecutive matches against Jordan in less than a minute. Benoit later wrestled Booker T in friendly competitions, until Booker and his wife, Sharmell, cheated Benoit out of the United States title on the October 21 episode of SmackDown!.

On November 13, 2005,  Eddie Guerrero was found dead in his hotel room. The following night, Raw held a Guerrero tribute show hosted by both Raw and SmackDown! wrestlers. Benoit was devastated at the loss of his best friend and was very emotional during a series of video testimonials, eventually breaking down on camera. The same week on SmackDown! (taped on the same night as Raw), Benoit defeated Triple H in a tribute match to Guerrero. Following the contest, Benoit, Triple H, and Dean Malenko all assembled in the ring and pointed to the sky in salute of Guerrero.

After controversy surrounding a United States Championship match against Booker T, Theodore Long set up a "Best of Seven" series between the two. Booker T won three times in a row (at Survivor Series, the November 29 SmackDown! Special, and the December 9 episode of SmackDown!), due largely to Sharmell's interference, and Benoit faced elimination in the series. Benoit won the fourth match to stay alive at Armageddon, but after the match, Booker suffered a legitimate groin injury, and Randy Orton was chosen as a stand-in. Benoit defeated Orton twice by disqualification on the December 30 and January 6, 2006 episodes of SmackDown!. However, in the seventh and final match, Orton defeated Benoit with the help of Booker T, Sharmell, and Orlando Jordan, and Booker captured the United States Championship. Benoit feuded with Orton for a short time, before defeating Orton in a No Holds Barred match on the January 27 episode of SmackDown! via the Crippler Crossface. Benoit was given one last chance at the United States Championship at No Way Out and won it by making Booker submit to the Crippler Crossface, ending the feud.

The next week on SmackDown!, Benoit (kayfabe) broke John "Bradshaw" Layfield (JBL)'s hand (JBL actually needed surgery to remove a cyst). A match was set up for the two at WrestleMania 22 for Benoit's title, and for the next several weeks, they attacked each other. At WrestleMania, JBL won the match with an illegal cradle to win the title. Benoit used his rematch clause two weeks later in a steel cage match on SmackDown!, but JBL again won with illegal tactics. Benoit entered the King of the Ring tournament, only to be defeated by Finlay in the opening round on the May 5 episode of SmackDown!, after Finlay struck Benoit's neck with a chair and delivered a Celtic Cross. At Judgment Day, Benoit gained some revenge by defeating Finlay with the Crippler Crossface in a grudge match. On the following episode of SmackDown!, Mark Henry brutalized Benoit during their match, giving him (kayfabe) back and rib injuries and causing him to bleed from his mouth. Benoit then took a sabbatical to heal nagging shoulder injuries.

On October 8, Benoit made his return at No Mercy, defeating William Regal in a surprise match. Later that week, he won his fifth United States Championship from Mr. Kennedy. Benoit then engaged in a feud with Chavo and Vickie Guerrero. He wanted answers from the Guerreros for their rash behaviour towards Rey Mysterio, but was avoided by the two and was eventually assaulted. This led to the two embarking on a feud with title matches at Survivor Series and Armageddon, matches that Benoit won. The feud culminated with one last title match as a No disqualification match, which was also won by Benoit. Later, Montel Vontavious Porter (MVP), who claimed that he was the best man to hold the United States title, challenged Benoit for the title at WrestleMania 23, where Benoit retained. Their rivalry continued with similar results again at Backlash. At Judgment Day, however, MVP gained the upper hand and won the title in a two out of three falls match, thus ending the feud. Benoit would wrestle MVP one last time at Saturday Night's Main Event XXXIV on May 28, (aired June 2), in a winning effort in a tag-team match where Benoit partnered with Batista and MVP partnered with then-World Heavyweight Champion Edge.

ECW (2007) 
On the June 11 episode of Raw, Benoit was drafted from SmackDown! to ECW as part of the 2007 WWE draft after losing to ECW World Champion Bobby Lashley. On the June 19 episode of ECW, Benoit wrestled his final match, defeating Elijah Burke in a match to determine who would compete for the vacated ECW World Championship at Vengeance on June 24. Since Lashley was drafted to Raw, he had vacated the title.

Benoit missed the weekend house shows, telling WWE officials that his wife and son were vomiting blood due to food poisoning. When he failed to show up for the pay-per-view, viewers were informed that he was unable to compete due to a "family emergency" and he was replaced in the title match by Johnny Nitro, who won the match and became ECW World Champion. The crowd spent the majority of the match chanting for Benoit. It would be revealed in the following days that Benoit had murdered his wife Nancy and son Daniel before committing suicide.

WWE executive Stephanie McMahon later indicated that Benoit would have defeated CM Punk for the ECW World Championship had he been present for the event. Professional wrestler and MMA fighter Bob Sapp, whom WWE had tried to sign up before a contract dispute with K-1 rendered it impossible, reported he would have been put into an oncoming angle with Benoit in case he would have been able to debut.

Professional wrestling style
Benoit included a wide array of submission holds in his move-set and used a crossface, dubbed the Crippler Crossface, and a sharpshooter as finishers. He also used a diving headbutt to finish off opponents. The diving headbutt, which saw the deliverer leap off the top rope and land head first on the opponent, was partially blamed for the head trauma that caused Benoit to commit his crimes. Another of Benoit's trademark moves was three rolling German suplexes. This move would later be mimicked by multiple other wrestlers, including Brock Lesnar who uses it as Suplex City.

Benoit was renowned for his high-impact technical style. Former WWE rival Kurt Angle said in a 2017 interview that "he has to got to be in the top three of all time."

Professional wrestling games

Championships and accomplishments 

 Cauliflower Alley Club
 Future Legend Award (2002)
 Catch Wrestling Association
 CWA World Tag Team Championship (1 time) – with Dave Taylor
 Extreme Championship Wrestling
 ECW World Tag Team Championship (1 time) – with Dean Malenko
 New Japan Pro-Wrestling
 IWGP Junior Heavyweight Championship (1 time)
 Super J-Cup (1994)
 Top/Best of the Super Juniors (1993, 1995)
 Super Grade Junior Heavyweight Tag League (1994) – with Shinjiro Otani
 Pro Wrestling Illustrated
 Feud of the Year (2004) 
 Match of the Year (2004) 
 Wrestler of the Year (2004)
 Ranked No. 1 of the top 500 singles wrestlers in the PWI 500 in 2004
 Ranked No. 69 of the top 500 greatest wrestlers in the PWI Years in 2003
 Stampede Wrestling
 Stampede British Commonwealth Mid-Heavyweight Championship (4 times)
 Stampede Wrestling International Tag Team Championship (4 times) – with Ben Bassarab (1), Keith Hart (1), Lance Idol (1), and Biff Wellington (1)
 Stampede Wrestling Hall of Fame (1995)
 Universal Wrestling Association
 WWF Light Heavyweight Championship (1 time)
 World Championship Wrestling
 WCW World Heavyweight Championship (1 time)
 WCW World Tag Team Championship (2 times) – with Dean Malenko (1) and Perry Saturn (1)
 WCW World Television Championship (3 times)
 WCW United States Heavyweight Championship (2 times)
 Seventh WCW Triple Crown Champion
 World Wrestling Federation/Entertainment
 World Heavyweight Championship (1 time)
 WWE Tag Team Championship (1 time, inaugural) – with Kurt Angle
 WWE United States Championship (3 times)
 WWF/WWE Intercontinental Championship (4 times)
 WWF/World Tag Team Championship (3 times) – with Chris Jericho (1) and Edge (2)
 Royal Rumble (2004)
 WWE Tag Team Championship Tournament (2002) – with Kurt Angle
 Twelfth Triple Crown Champion
 Wrestling Observer Newsletter
 Best Brawler (2004)
 Best Technical Wrestler (1994, 1995, 2000, 2003, 2004)
 Feud of the Year (2004) 
 Match of the Year (2002) 
 Most Outstanding Wrestler (2000, 2004)
 Most Underrated (1998)
 Readers' Favorite Wrestler (1997, 2000)
 Wrestling Observer Newsletter Hall of Fame (Class of 2003)

Personal life

Benoit spoke both English and French fluently. He married twice, and had two children (David and Megan) with his first wife, Martina. By 1997, that marriage had broken down, and Benoit was living with Nancy Sullivan, the wife of the WCW booker and frequent opponent Kevin Sullivan. On February 25, 2000, Chris and Nancy's son Daniel was born; on November 23, 2000, Chris and Nancy married. It was Nancy's third marriage. In 2003, Nancy filed for divorce from Benoit, citing the marriage as "irrevocably broken" and alleging "cruel treatment". She claimed that he would break and throw furniture around. She later dropped the suit as well as the restraining order she had filed.

Benoit became good friends with fellow wrestler Eddie Guerrero following a match in Japan, when Benoit kicked Guerrero in the head and knocked him out cold. 

Benoit was also close friends with Dean Malenko, as the trio travelled from promotion to promotion together putting on matches, eventually being dubbed the "Three Amigos" by commentators. According to Benoit, the Crippler Crossface was borrowed from Malenko and eventually caught on as Benoit's signature hold.

Benoit's lost tooth, his top-right lateral incisor, was commonly misattributed to training or an accident early on in his wrestling career. It actually resulted from an accident involving his pet rottweiler: one day while playing with the dog, the animal's skull struck Benoit's chin, and his tooth "popped out".

Death

On June 25, 2007, police entered Benoit's home in Fayetteville, Georgia when WWE, Benoit's employers, requested a "welfare check" after Benoit missed weekend events without notice, leading to concerns. The officers discovered the bodies of Benoit, his wife Nancy, and their 7-year-old son Daniel at around 2:30 p.m. EDT. Upon investigating, no additional suspects were sought by authorities. It was determined that Benoit had committed the murders. Over a three-day period, Benoit had killed his wife and son before committing  suicide. His wife was bound before the killing. Benoit's son was drugged with Xanax and likely unconscious before Benoit strangled him. Benoit then committed suicide by hanging himself on his lat pulldown machine.

WWE cancelled the scheduled three-hour long live Raw show on June 25 and replaced the broadcast version with a three-hour tribute to his life and career, featuring his past matches, segments from the Hard Knocks: The Chris Benoit Story DVD, and comments from wrestlers and announcers.

Toxicology reports released on July 17, 2007, revealed that at their time of death, Nancy had three different drugs in her system: Xanax, hydrocodone, and hydromorphone, all of which were found at the therapeutic rather than toxic levels. Daniel was found to have Xanax in his system, which led the chief medical examiner to believe that he was sedated before he was murdered. Benoit was found to have Xanax, hydrocodone, and an elevated level of testosterone, caused by a synthetic form of the hormone, in his system. The chief medical examiner attributed the testosterone level to Benoit possibly being treated for a deficiency caused by previous steroid abuse or testicular insufficiency. There was no indication that anything in Benoit's body contributed to his violent behaviour that led to the murder-suicide, concluding that there was no "roid-rage" involved. Prior to the murder-suicide, Benoit had illegally been given medications not in compliance with WWE's Talent Wellness Program in February 2006, including nandrolone, an anabolic steroid, and anastrozole, a breast cancer medication which is used by bodybuilders for its powerful antiestrogenic effects. During the investigation into steroid abuse, it was revealed that other wrestlers had also been given steroids.

After the double-murder suicide, former wrestler Christopher Nowinski contacted Michael Benoit, Chris' father, suggesting that years of trauma to his son's brain may have led to his actions. Tests were conducted on Benoit's brain by Julian Bailes, the head of neurosurgery at West Virginia University, and results showed that "Benoit's brain was so severely damaged it resembled the brain of an 85-year-old Alzheimer's patient." He was reported to have had an advanced form of dementia, similar to the brains of four retired NFL players who had had multiple concussions, sank into depression, and harmed themselves or others. Bailes and his colleagues concluded that repeated concussions can lead to dementia, which can contribute to severe behavioural problems. Benoit's father suggests that brain damage may have been the leading cause.

Once the details of Benoit's actions became apparent, WWE made the decision to remove nearly all mentions of Benoit from their website, future broadcasts, and all publications.

See also 
 Chronic traumatic encephalopathy
 List of premature professional wrestling deaths

Notes

References

Sources 
 
 
 SLAM! Wrestling — Chris Benoit
 Metro — 60 Seconds: Chris Benoit by Andrew Williams
 Wrestling Digest: Technically Speaking, wrestler and sports entertainer Chris Benoit

External links 

 
 
 
 

1967 births
2007 suicides
21st-century Canadian criminals
Canadian emigrants to the United States
Canadian expatriate professional wrestlers in the United States
Canadian football offensive linemen
Canadian male criminals
Canadian male professional wrestlers
Canadian murderers of children
Canadian people of French descent
Criminals from Georgia (U.S. state)
Criminals from Montreal
ECW World Tag Team Champions
Expatriate professional wrestlers in Japan
Franco-Albertan people
French Quebecers
Male murderers
Masked wrestlers
Murder–suicides in Georgia (U.S. state)
NWA/WCW World Television Champions
NWA/WCW/WWE United States Heavyweight Champions
Professional wrestlers from Alberta
Professional wrestlers with chronic traumatic encephalopathy
Sportspeople from Edmonton
Suicides by hanging in Georgia (U.S. state)
The Four Horsemen (professional wrestling) members
WCW World Heavyweight Champions
WWF/WWE Intercontinental Champions
20th-century professional wrestlers
21st-century professional wrestlers
Professional wrestlers from Montreal
Stampede Wrestling British Commonwealth Mid-Heavyweight Champions
Stampede Wrestling International Tag Team Champions
WCW World Tag Team Champions